Hidebound (Icelandic: Þröng Sýn) is a 2005 animated film that tells of Aron, a young man who is concerned about communications and the human situation in society. He decides to conduct an experiment and observes the reactions of other people to it. Through this unique experiment or observations we meet several characters that each tells us a different story about how people respond to a new experience and how they behave under pressure.

The way Hidebound is made reflects exactly this experimental way. The film was first shot on DV where after editing, the frames were printed out. During fairs and festivals in Reykjavík, Iceland, members of the general public where offered to help in making of the film by tracing their own style the people from these print-outs. Over 1.350 people contributed with well over 16.000 traces and drawings that were scanned and used in the animation of the film. Backgrounds and other animation were created by a team of young artists in Reykjavík, led by the directors and creators of this project, Guðmundur Arnar and Þórgnýr Thoroddsen. Hidebound is their first animated film.

External links 

2000s animated short films
Icelandic-language films
CAOZ films
2005 films
Icelandic animated short films